The 1978–79 NBA season was the 76ers 30th season in the NBA and 16th season in Philadelphia. Coach Billy Cunningham began to mold a unit that played a team concept, as opposed to one made up of stars focusing on their own individual talents. The trade for forward Bobby Jones and the drafting of point guard Maurice Cheeks, further solidified this progression. The Sixers would finish the regular season at 47–35. They would lose in the Eastern Conference semi-finals to the San Antonio Spurs. From 1977 through 1983 (seven seasons), this would be the only year that the team failed to reach the Eastern Conference Finals.

Draft picks

Roster

Regular season

Season standings

z - clinched division title
y - clinched division title
x - clinched playoff spot

Record vs. opponents

Playoffs

|- align="center" bgcolor="#ccffcc"
| 1
| April 11
| New Jersey
| W 122–114
| Julius Erving (37)
| George McGinnis (14)
| Henry Bibby (8)
| Spectrum8,846
| 1–0
|- align="center" bgcolor="#ccffcc"
| 2
| April 13
| @ New Jersey
| W 111–101
| Caldwell Jones (24)
| Caldwell Jones (21)
| three players tied (5)
| Rutgers Athletic Center9,126
| 2–0
|-

|- align="center" bgcolor="#ffcccc"
| 1
| April 15
| @ San Antonio
| L 106–119
| Darryl Dawkins (25)
| Caldwell Jones (15)
| Julius Erving (7)
| HemisFair Arena10,253
| 0–1
|- align="center" bgcolor="#ffcccc"
| 2
| April 17
| @ San Antonio
| L 120–121
| Julius Erving (25)
| Caldwell Jones (11)
| Henry Bibby (10)
| HemisFair Arena16,709
| 0–2
|- align="center" bgcolor="#ccffcc"
| 3
| April 20
| San Antonio
| W 123–115
| Julius Erving (39)
| Caldwell Jones (12)
| Maurice Cheeks (9)
| Spectrum14,039
| 1–2
|- align="center" bgcolor="#ffcccc"
| 4
| April 22
| San Antonio
| L 112–115
| Maurice Cheeks (33)
| Steve Mix (9)
| Maurice Cheeks (9)
| Spectrum11,163
| 1–3
|- align="center" bgcolor="#ccffcc"
| 5
| April 26
| @ San Antonio
| W 120–97
| Julius Erving (32)
| Caldwell Jones (14)
| Maurice Cheeks (12)
| HemisFair Arena16,055
| 2–3
|- align="center" bgcolor="#ccffcc"
| 6
| April 29
| San Antonio
| W 92–90
| Caldwell Jones (20)
| Caldwell Jones (17)
| Maurice Cheeks (6)
| Spectrum18,276
| 3–3
|- align="center" bgcolor="#ffcccc"
| 7
| May 2
| @ San Antonio
| L 108–111
| Julius Erving (34)
| Caldwell Jones (14)
| Maurice Cheeks (13)
| HemisFair Arena16,055
| 3–4
|-

Awards and records
Bobby Jones, NBA All-Defensive First Team

References

Philadelphia 76ers seasons
Philadelphia
Philadel
Philadel